Prison Ship, also known as Star Slammer, Adventures of Taura, Part 1 , Starslammer: The Escape and Prison Ship Star Slammer, is a 1986 American science fiction film directed by Fred Olen Ray.

Plot
On the planet Arous, Captain Bantor (Ross Hagen), the Sovereign (Lindy Sykes) and the Inquisitor (Aldo Ray) attempt to quell an uprising of the defiant residents.

Freelance miner Taura is forced to defend herself against the marauding starship captain, Bantor. During their struggle, Taura causes Bantor to lose his hand in a volcanic acid plume. Taura is friendly to the locals and employees them in her mining operation. Bantor had attempted to claim the mined crystals for the Magistrate, leading to confrontation.

Taura is subsequently sentenced to a term aboard the prison ship, Vehemence, under the sadistic female warden, Exene. She finds life amid the other female inmates tough, but soon, gains their respect, making a friend in Mike.

Bantor then comes aboard Vehemence, now deranged as a result of losing his hand, seeking to obtain a mind control process that reduces the prisoners to zombies. His arrival proves to be Taura’s chance to escape the prison ship or "star slammer" and return to home planet of Arous.

Cast
Sandy Brooke as Taura
Susan Stokey as Mike
Marya Gant as Warden Exene
Ross Hagen as Bantor
Dawn Wildsmith as Muffin
Richard Alan Hench as Garth
Michael D. Sonye as Krago
Mimi Monaco as Squeeker
Jade Barrett as Dr Po
Lindy Skyles as The Sovereign
Johnny Legend as Zaal
Aldo Ray as The Inquisitor
John Carradine as The Judge

Production
The film was shot at Roger Corman's New World studio on Main Street in Venice, California. Fred Olen Ray rented the studio for two weekends (four days). One day he spent shooting scenes for his film Biohazard. The other three days were spent filming footage for Prison Ship. Ray says he was inspired by Roger Corman making The Terror using left over sets from The Raven. Aldo Ray was hired for one day's work. Ray then used this footage to raise money to complete the picture. Funds were raised from Jack H. Harris. The film has a scene, with the monster of "The Deadly Spawn". The film is divided into chapters. One of Ray's first movies.

Reception
In Creature Feature, the movie received one out of five stars, calling the movie "hilariously bad," citing the script as the main problem Austin Trunick writing for the website "Under the Radar" stated: "Star Slammer was shot quickly and on the cheap, but has far better production values than similar, bottom shelf sci-fi or women in prison flicks from the era. It hits most of the notes you’d expect from the genres – extraterrestrial dwarfs, robots, cat fights, a sadistic (female) warden, and forced combat". Moria gave the movie two stars, finding it a cheesy parody of science fiction and serial movies. TV Guide noted that the film was inept, finding it had many of the clichés of women in prison movies .

Release

Cannes Film Festival May 11, 1987 and released widely in the same year

Sequel

According to the end credits, a sequel called Chain Gain Planet was planned.

Home Media

Available to stream on many services as of July 2021.

References

External links

Review of film at Moria

1986 films
American science fiction films
Films directed by Fred Olen Ray
1980s science fiction films
1980s English-language films
1980s American films